Sutton London Borough Council in London, England is elected every four years.

Political control
The first elections to the council were held in 1964, ahead of the new system coming into full effect in 1965. Political control of the council since 1964 has been held by the following parties:

Leadership
The leaders of the council since 1965 have been:

Council elections
 1964 Sutton London Borough Council election
 1968 Sutton London Borough Council election
 1971 Sutton London Borough Council election
 1974 Sutton London Borough Council election
 1978 Sutton London Borough Council election (boundary changes increased the number of seats by five)
 1982 Sutton London Borough Council election
 1986 Sutton London Borough Council election
 1990 Sutton London Borough Council election
 1994 Sutton London Borough Council election (boundary changes took place but the number of seats remained the same)
 1998 Sutton London Borough Council election (boundary changes took place but the number of seats remained the same)
 2002 Sutton London Borough Council election (boundary changes reduced the number of seats by two) 
 2006 Sutton London Borough Council election
 2010 Sutton London Borough Council election
 2014 Sutton London Borough Council election
 2018 Sutton London Borough Council election
 2022 Sutton London Borough Council election

Borough result maps

By-election results

1964-1968
There were no by-elections.

1968-1971

1971-1974
There were no by-elections.

1974-1978

1978-1982

1982-1986

1986-1990

1990-1994

The by-election was called following the resignation of Cllr. Alan R. Chewter.

1994-1998

The by-election was called following the resignation of Cllr. Delphine C. Lock.

The by-election was called following the disqualification of Cllr. Patrick B. Kane.

The by-election was called following the resignation of Cllr. Daphne A. Gvozdenovie. 

The by-election was called following the resignation of Cllr. Richard F. Broadbent.

The by-election was called following the resignation of Cllr. Christine L. B. Headley.

The by-election was called following the death of Cllr. Donald B. Hopkins.

The by-election was called following the resignation of Cllr. Gary F. Stagg.

1998-2002

The by-election was called following the resignation of Cllr. Sarah S. Wallace.

The by-election was called following the resignation of Cllr. Richard S. Aitken.

2002-2006

The by-election was called following the resignation of Cllr. Michael A. Cooper.

2006-2010

The by-election was called following the disqualification of Cllr. Eleanor D. Pinfold.

The by-election was called following the death of Cllr. Christopher P. Dunlop.

2010-2014

The by-election was called following the resignation of Cllr. Ms. Jennifer E. Campbell-Klomps.

The by-election was called following the resignation of Cllr. Brendan Hudson.

2014-2018

The by-election was triggered by the death of Councillor Colin Hall, the Liberal Democrat deputy leader.

The by-election was triggered by the resignation of Councillor Alan Salter

2018-2022
There have been no by-elections so far in this period.

References

 By-election results

External links
Sutton Council